Shifting City is an album by John Foxx and Louis Gordon, released in 1997 (although some sources cite 1995 as the release year). Released simultaneously with Foxx's ambient album Cathedral Oceans, Shifting City was Foxx's first album release since In Mysterious Ways (1985).

Stylistically Shifting City marked a return to the electronic sound of Foxx's 1980 solo album Metamatic, although it also shows an influence of 1960s The Beatles-style psychedelia, a style which Foxx had already experimented with on 1983's The Golden Section.

A 2 CD special edition was released in October 2009, including three previously unreleased bonus tracks. Disc Two of this special re-issue contains the previously released “The Omnidelic Exotour” material, recorded live by Foxx and Gordon at A Certain Ratio's Warehouse in Ancoats, Manchester and at Metamatic Studio in 1997.

Track listing

1997 original release

 "The Noise" (Foxx) – 4:17
 "Crash" (Foxx, Gordon) – 5:24
 "Here We Go" (Foxx, Gordon) – 7:03
 "Shadow Man" (Foxx) – 7:26
 "Through My Sleeping" (Foxx) – 5:03
 "Forgotten Years" (Foxx, Gordon) – 5:43
 "Everyone" (Foxx, Gordon) – 5:48
 "Shifting City" (Foxx) – 3:36
 "Concrete, Bulletproof, Invisible" (Foxx, Gordon, Leven) – 5:42
 "An Ocean We Can Breathe" (Foxx, Gordon) – 6:23

 "Through My Sleeping" (originally titled "Leaving") and "Concrete, Bulletproof, Invisible" are rerecordings of material originally recorded by Foxx with Nation 12. On Nation 12's Electrofear album the tracks are credited to John Foxx, Shem McAuley, Kurt Rodgers and Simon Rodgers.

2009 Special edition

CD1
 "The Noise"
 "Crash"
 "Here We Go"
 "Shadow Man"
 "Through My Sleeping"
 "Forgotten Years"
 "Everyone"
 "Shifting City"
 "Concrete, Bulletproof, Invisible"
 "An Ocean We Can Breathe"
 "Shadow Man" (Early Version - Mono mix)
 "Quiet Men" (Subterranean Omnidelic Exotour)
 "Just for a Moment" (Subterranean Omnidelic Exotour)

CD2
 "20th Century" (Omnidelic Exotour)
 "Burning Car" (Omnidelic Exotour)
 "Overpass" (Omnidelic Exotour)
 "This City" (Omnidelic Exotour)
 "Hiroshima Mon Amour" (Omnidelic Exotour)
 "Just for a Moment" (Omnidelic Exotour)
 "Quiet Men" (Omnidelic Exotour)
 "Dislocation" (Omnidelic Exotour)
 "An Ocean We Can Breathe" (Omnidelic Exotour)
 "Through My Sleeping" (Omnidelic Exotour)
 "The Noise" (Omnidelic Exotour)
 "Shifting City" (Omnidelic Exotour)
 "Endlessly" (Omnidelic Exotour)

Personnel

 John Foxx: vocals, synthesisers, rhythm machines
 Louis Gordon: synthesisers, rhythm machines, backing vocals

References

John Foxx albums
1997 albums